Dichomeris horocompsa is a moth in the family Gelechiidae. It was described by Edward Meyrick in 1933. It is found in Bolivia.

References

Moths described in 1933
horocompsa